Herbert Timms (6 July 1890 – 1 March 1973) was an English cricketer. He played for Gloucestershire between 1912 and 1912.

References

1890 births
1973 deaths
English cricketers
Gloucestershire cricketers
People from Moreton-in-Marsh
Sportspeople from Gloucestershire